MIR181A2 host gene is a protein that in humans is encoded by the MIR181A2HG gene.

References